Saint-Just-en-Chaussée is a commune in the Oise department in northern France. Saint-Just-en-Chaussée station has rail connections to Amiens, Creil and Paris.

History
Its name refers to Saint Justus of Beauvais, who is said to have been martyred at this spot.

Population

Personalities
Valentin Haüy and René Just Haüy (brothers) were born in Saint-Just-en-Chaussée.

See also
 Communes of the Oise department

References

Communes of Oise